Siegfried Lienhard (29 August 1924, in Sankt Veit an der Glan – 6 March 2011) was a professor of Indology at Stockholm University and a scholar of Sanskrit and the Newar language.

He published on the history of poetry in South Asia, as well as a catalogue of the Newar manuscripts held in the State Library of Berlin, a collection of Newar folk songs, and textual studies of classical Newar texts.  In 1995 his students and colleagues published a Festschrift in his honour. In 2007 Oskar von Hinueber edited the collected minor writings of Siegfried Lienhard.

Bibliography

Books
(1963). Maṇicūḍāvadānoddhṛta: a Buddhist re-birth story in the Nevārī language. Stockholm: Almqvist & Wiksell.
(1974). Nevārīgītīmañjarī: religious and secular poetry of the Nevars of the Kathmandu Valley. Stockholm : Almqvist & Wiksell international.
(1980). Die Legende vom Prinzen Viśvantara. Eine nepalesische Bilderrolle aus der Sammlung des Museums for Indische Kunst Berlin. Berlin. Veröffentlichungen des Museums für Indische Kunst Berlin, 5.
(1984). Songs of Nepal: an anthology of Nevar folksongs and hymns. Honolulu: University of Hawaii Press.
(1984) A History of Classical Poetry: Sanskrit, Pali, Prakrit. Otto Harrassowitz Verlag.
(1988). Nepalese manuscripts. part 1, Nevari and Sanskrit--Staatsbibliothek Preussischer Kulturbesitz, Berlin. Stuttgart: Franz Steiner.
(1999).  Diamantmeister und Hausvater : Buddhistisches Gemeindeleben in Nepal. Wien: Verlag der Osterreichischen Akademie der Wissenschaften.

Articles
(2007). Kleine Schriften / Siegfried Lienhard. Oskar von Hinüber, ed.  Wiesbaden: Harrassowitz, 2007.

FestschriftSauhṛdyamaṅgalam : studies in honour of Siegfried Lienhard on his 70th birthday.'' Mirja Juntunen et al. eds. Stockholm: Association of Oriental Studies, 1995.

References

Newar studies scholars
1924 births
Indologists
2011 deaths